Dağdibi can refer to:

 Dağdibi, Düzce
 Dağdibi, Oltu
 Dağdibi, Pozantı